WNT1-inducible-signaling pathway protein 3 (WISP3, also named CCN6) is a matricellular protein that in humans is encoded by the WISP3 gene.

Structure 

It is a member of the CCN family (CCN intercellular signaling protein) of secreted, extracellular matrix (ECM)-associated signaling matricellular proteins. The CCN acronym is derived from the first three members of the family identified, namely CYR61 (cysteine-rich angiogenic inducer 61, or CCN1), CTGF (connective tissue growth factor, or CCN2), and NOV (nephroblastoma overexpressed, or CCN3). These proteins, together with WISP1 (CCN4), and WISP2 (CCN5) comprise the six-member CCN family in vertebrates. CCN proteins characteristically contain an N-terminal secretory signal peptide followed by four structurally distinct domains with homologies to insulin-like growth factor binding protein (IGFBP), von Willebrand type C repeats (vWC), thrombospondin type 1 repeat (TSR), and a cysteine knot motif within the C-terminal (CT) domain.

Function 

The CCN family of proteins regulates diverse cellular functions, including cell adhesion, migration, proliferation, survival, and differentiation.

Clinical significance 

Mutations in the human WISP3 gene are associated with progressive pseudorheumatoid dysplasia, a juvenile onset autosomal recessive skeletal disorder, indicating that the gene is essential for normal postnatal skeletal growth and cartilage homeostasis. However, mice with WISP3 knockout or overexpression are normal and suffer no apparent developmental defect. Loss of WISP3 expression is associated with aggressive inflammatory breast cancer and breast cancer with axillary lymph node metastasis, suggesting that WISP3/CCN6 may function as a suppressor of breast cancer growth and metastasis.

References

CCN proteins